Trial and Error is an American sitcom that was broadcast on CBS from March 15 to March 29, 1988. It was cancelled after the third episode, leaving the remaining five episodes unaired.

Development
Trial and Error evolved from a pilot entitled The Family Martinez created by comedian Tommy Chong, about a reformed Latino gang member who became a trial lawyer and moved back in with his family in East Los Angeles, California. CBS liked the concept, but wanted to change it from a family sitcom to a buddy comedy, and it was subsequently reworked as Amigos by Don Seigel and Jerry Perzigian. Chong remained on board as a producer, but "never showed up" to any of the writing sessions. Paul Rodriguez objected to the title Amigos, saying it was too stereotypical, and the title was changed to Trial and Error.

Brad Pitt was cast as the bellboy in the second episode, entitled "Bon Appetit." According to executive producer Jerry Perzigian, this was Pitt's first paid Hollywood job. Pitt had arrived from Springfield, Missouri, only three days before the shoot, which took place on November 17, 1987. The episode aired on CBS on March 22, 1988.

Premise
The series is about two Latino roommates – John Hernandez and Tony Rivera – living in Los Angeles. John is an attorney and Tony is a T-shirt salesman.

Cast
Eddie Velez as John Hernandez
Paul Rodriguez as Tony Rivera
John de Lancie as Bob Adams
Debbie Shapiro as Rhonda
Stephen Elliott as Edmund Kittie
Susan Saldivar as Lisa

Episodes

References

External links

TV.com
TV Guide
Opening credits for Trial and Error and Raising Miranda on YouTube

1988 American television series debuts
1988 American television series endings
1980s American sitcoms
English-language television shows
CBS original programming
Television shows set in Los Angeles
Television series by Sony Pictures Television
Latino sitcoms